Chrysiptera caeruleolineata, commonly called the blueline demoiselle, is a species of damselfish from the Indian and western Pacific Oceans. It is up to 6 centimeters long.

References

caeruleolineata
Fish described in 1973